Gamzat-bek (Avar: ХIамзат Бек, Chechen: Хьамзат Бек, Гамзат-бек in Russian), Hamza-Bek, Hamza Bek ibn Ali Iskandar Bek al-Hutsali (1789 — October 1(September 19), 1834) was the second imam of the Caucasian Imamate, who succeeded Ghazi Mollah upon his death in 1832. 

Gamzat-bek was a son of one of the Avar beks. He was educated under the supervision of Muslim preachers and became an avid follower of a sufi order. In August 1834, Gamzat-bek launched an assault on Avar khans, who had been supporting the Russian Empire government and who had been hostile towards the sufism movement. He succeeded in capturing the Avar capital of Khunzakh and executed its female ruler Pakhubike and her sons. Within the next eighteen months, Gamzat-bek had been actively fighting against the Russian Empire. The supporters of the Avar khans, including Hadji Murad, conspired against Gamzat-bek and killed him (Leo Tolstoy's story Hadji Murat is based on this event). After the death of Gamzat-bek, Imam Shamil became the third imam of Dagestan. For more information see Murid War.

Further reading
 Kaziev, Shapi. Imam Shamil. "Molodaya Gvardiya" publishers. Moscow, 2001, 2003, 2006, 2010

1789 births
1834 deaths
People from Khunzakhsky District
Avar people
19th-century Islamic religious leaders
People of the Caucasian War
Muslims from the Russian Empire
Warriors from the Russian Empire
North Caucasian independence activists